Berry Hill Plantation, also known simply as Berry Hill, is a historic plantation located on the west side of South Boston in Halifax County, Virginia, United States.  The main house, transformed c. 1839 into one of Virginia's finest examples of Greek Revival architecture, was designated a National Historic Landmark in 1969.  The surviving portion of the plantation, which was once one of the largest in the state, is now a conference and event center.

Description and history
The main house is a two-story brick structure, finished in stucco and topped by a gabled roof. The main facade is in emulation of the Parthenon, with eight massive Doric columns supporting an entablature and fully pedimented gable.

The plantation has one of the largest slave cemeteries in Virginia, holding the graves of more than two hundred slaves, and includes well-preserved slave quarters.

The plantation was originally owned by Isaac Coles, who began using slaves in 1802.  In 1814 and 1841, the plantation changed owners, finally ending up under the control of James Coles Bruce in 1832.  Bruce is credited with transforming the existing 18th-century brick plantation house then standing into the Greek Revival mansion seen today.  Bruce is believed to have consulted with architect John E. Johnson, who designed Staunton Hill, the mansion of his half-brother.

Today
The main house is now the centerpiece of the Berry Hill Resort and Conference Center, which provides accommodations and event facilities for weddings and corporate events.

Gallery

See also
List of National Historic Landmarks in Virginia
National Register of Historic Places listings in Halifax County, Virginia

References

External links

Berry Hill Resort web site

Information on Berry Hill from Virginia African Heritage Program

Houses on the National Register of Historic Places in Virginia
National Historic Landmarks in Virginia
Houses in Halifax County, Virginia
Houses completed in 1839
Greek Revival houses in Virginia
Plantation houses in Virginia
National Register of Historic Places in Halifax County, Virginia
Historic American Buildings Survey in Virginia
Slave cabins and quarters in the United States